List of squads at 2007 CONCACAF U-17 Tournament

Group A

Coach: Norberto Huezo

Coach: Jean Labase

Coach: Miguel Escalante

Coach: Jesús Ramírez

Group B

Coach: Stephen Hart

Coach: Manuel Ubeña

Coach: David Hunt

Coach: Anton Corneal

Coach: William Fulk

References

External links
 CONCACAF 2007 Under-17 Tournament Recap

CONCACAF U-17 Championship squads
squads